João Paulo Cuenca (born 1978 in Rio de Janeiro) is a Brazilian writer. 

In 2012, the English literary magazine Granta named him as one of the 20 best Brazilian writers under 40. In 2007, he was selected by the Hay Festival as one of the most talented Latin American writers under 39.

Career 

João Paulo Cuenca was born in Rio de Janeiro, Brazil, in 1978. He is the author of “Body present” (2003), “The Mastroianni Day” (2007), “The only happy ending for a love story is an accident” (2010) and “The day I found out I was dead” (2015). His novels have been translated into eight languages and had its rights sold to eleven countries so far. He is a weekly columnist for major Brazilian newspapers and magazines since 2003 and now writes for Folha de São Paulo, the biggest national newspaper. An anthology of his articles, “The last dawn”, was published in 2012.

In 2007, he was selected by the Hay Festival and by the organisers of the Bogotá World Book Capital as one of the 39 highest profile Latin American writers under the age of 39. He has also been selected for the very first ever issue Best of Young Brazilian Novelists of the  literary magazine Granta in 2012. In recent years, he's been writing plays, film and television scripts. "The Death of J.P. Cuenca" (2015), which took part at the first Venice Biennale College Production Lab, is his first feature film as a writer/director and was premiered at Rio and São Paulo International Film Festivals and had its European premiere at main competition selection of the prestigious CPH:DOX in Denmark.

He participated in lectures as a guest writer in PUC-Rio (2004), UFRJ (2004), Sorbonne Nouvelle - Paris III (2006),  Columbia University (2011), Princeton University (2011, 2014), Heidelberg University (2012), Salzburg University (2012), Yale University (2014), Brown University (2013, 2014), UCLA (2014), Stanford (2014), University of Illinois (2014), among many others. He was invited to festivals such as Hay Festival Cartagena de Indias (Colombia, 2008, 2013), Berlin International Literature Festival (2012, 2013),  Frankfurt Book Fair (2012, 2013),  Xalapa Hay Festival in Mexico (2012), Guadalajara Book Fair (2012), London Brazilian Festival (2010), Americas Society Symposium on Brazilian Literature (New York, 2011), Festival Vivamerica (Madrid, 2011), Correntes d'Escritas (Portugal, 2008, 2009, 2011) etc. He was the chief curator of the Bahia Book Fair in 2013 and of the Belo Horizonte Book Fair in 2014. He Won a Civitella Ranieri Writing Fellowship in 2013 and was a Writer-in-Residence at the Programa Avançado de Cultura Contemporânea of UFRJ (PACC) in 2014.

Apart from writing novels, Cuenca worked as a journalist and columnist for various major Brazilian newspapers and magazines, among them »O Globo«. An anthology of his chronicles and columns appeared only recently in the volume »A última madrugada« (2012; tr: The last dawn). João Paulo Cuenca’s texts have already appeared in anthologies inside and outside of Brazil.

Novels

Corpo presente, Planeta, 2002
O dia Mastroianni, Agir, 2007
O único final feliz para uma história de amor é um acidente, Companhia das Letras, 2010
Descobri que estava morto, Caminho, 2015

Chronicles
A Última Madrugada, LeYa, 2012

Anthologies
Parati para mim, Rio de Janeiro: Agir, 2003
Prosas Cariocas, Rio de Janeiro: Casa da Palavra, 2004
Contos sobre tela, Rio de Janeiro: Pinakotheke, 2005
Paralelos, Rio de Janeiro: Agir, 2005
Bogotá 39, Antologia de cuento latinoamericano, Bogotá:Ediciones B, 2007
Cenas da Favela Geração Editorial, 2007
B39 — Antologia de cuento latinoamericano Ediciones B, Uruguai 2007
Bogotá 39, Antologia de cuento latinoamericano, Bogotá:Ediciones B, 2007
Cem melhores crônicas brasileiras Editora Objetiva, 2007
Missives – Nouvelles brésilliennes contemporaines Société Littéraire, França, 2008
10 cariocas, Rosario: Ferreyra Editor, 2009
Libardade até agora Mobile Editorial, 2011
 Granta 9, Alfaguara, 2012.

Translated publications
Una giornata Mastroianni Cavalo di Fierro, Italy, 2008
O Dia Mastroianni Caminho Editorial, Portugal, 2009
Mastroianni. Ein Tag A-1, Germany, 2013
O único final feliz para uma história de amor é um acidente, Caminho Editorial, Portugal, 2011
El único final feliz para una história de amor es un accidente, (trad. Martín Caamaño), Editorial Lengua de Trapo, Spain, 2012
Das einzig glückliche Ende einer Liebesgeschichte ist ein Unfall, (trad. Michael Kegler), A1 Verlag, Germany 2012
The only happy ending for a love story is an accident, (trad. Elizabeth Lowe), Tagus Press, US, 20123
La seule fin heureuse pour une histoire d’amour, c’est un accident, (trad. Dominique Nédellec), Cambourakis, France, 20123
Ainoa onnellinen loppu rakkaustarinalle on onnettomuus, (trad. Pirkka Valkama), Ivan Rotta & Co, Finland, 2014
Singurul final fericit pentru o poveste de dragoste e un accident, (trad. Iolanda Vasile), Polirom, Romania, 2015
Cuerpo Presente, (trad. Martín Caamaño), Dakota, Argentina, set to be published 2016
Ho scoperto di essere morto, (trad. Eloisa del Giudice), Miraggi Edizioni, Torino, 2016

Film
The Death of J.P. Cuenca, Duas Mariola, 2015

TV
Afinal, o que querem as mulheres? (com Cecilia Giannetti e Michel Melamed) Rede Globo, 2011
"Estúdio i", na Globo News, como comentarista de literatura.
"Nada tenho de meu", no Canal Brasil, November and December 2012.

Sources

External links
 J.P. Cuenca's website
 "The Death of J.P. Cuenca" website
 Articles - Folha de São Paulo
 Articles - O Globo

Brazilian writers
1978 births
Living people